Thomas Degasperi (born 18 January 1981) is an Italian professional water skier. He has won two World Championships, one Masters title, three Moomba masters titles, the Malibu open twice, the World Games, the European championships eight times, the Canadian open, the Ski West Pro, the New Zealand Pro Am twice, the Atalanta Pro Am twice, the Mexico Pro Am, the Global Invitations pro, the Alizee cup, the San Gervasio Pro Am the Botas Pro Am and many more for a total of over 28 pro titles and over 60 pro podiums.

Thomas is also well known on the TV screen. In Italy he was a contestant on the popular reality TV show Dancing with the Stars. In the USA he had his own TV commercial on national television with his sponsor, 5 Hour Energy.

Thomas attended the University of Louisiana at Monroe as part of the Waterski team and he obtained his bachelor's degree in Marketing

Biography
Born in Trento, Italy, he started water-skiing at age five.  He was encouraged by his father, Marco Degasperi, a well-known water-skiing coach and practiced at his father's ski school on Caldonazzo Lake in northern Italy. At 15 he won his first medal at the European Championships: Gold in the slalom. And the rest is history

His major achievements are :

Word Championships titles 2007, 2011

World Championships silver medals 2009, 2015, 2021

European Championships titles 2002, 2005, 2006, 2007, 2009, 2016, 2019, 2021, 2022

Masters title 2014

Moomba Masters Titles 2014, 2017, 2019

Malibu Open titles 2006, 2016

World Games title 2013

Other titles includes: the Alizee Cup, the Global international pro, the Mexico pro am, 2 Atlanta pro wins, ski west pro champion, Canadian Open champion, 2 New Zealand Pro am titles, the San Gervasio Pro Am title in 2021, the 2022 Botas Pro Am

And a Staggering total of over 65 Pro Podiums

References 

Italian water skiers
University of Louisiana at Monroe alumni
1981 births
Living people
Male professional water skiers
Competitors at the 2017 World Games
World Games bronze medalists